Chanhassen High School (CNHS) is a four-year comprehensive public high school located in Chanhassen, Minnesota, United States, a southwestern suburb of Minneapolis. Construction of the school was approved by voters in 2006 in response to rapidly growing enrollment in Carver County and overcrowding at Chaska High School, the district's other high school.

History 
As a result of steady population increases in Carver County, Chaska High School's enrollment surpassed its building's designed capacity, with future growth in the school district expected. As a result, voters approved a referendum in 2006 to provide funding for a new high school. The vote was very close, a matter of 2% of the population. Opponents of the bond referendum claimed the school district had not looked into other ideas for the district beyond building a new high school and that the district did not take into consideration other options they may have had (using current buildings). During its inaugural year the school did not have a senior class.

Academics 
In the years the school has been open, Chanhassen students have excelled in academics, ranking in the top 3% of high schools nationwide. Chanhassen offers 25 different Advanced Placement courses and in 2015 had a Challenge Index of 2.570, which means that more than two AP exams were taken for every member of the most recent graduating class.

The administration at Chanhassen aims to provide personalized learning, a unique approach to educating, remaining small yet continuing to offer college preparatory courses and a comprehensive curriculum. Students choose electives from four areas of Interest designed to offer depth in an area of particular relevant for emerging passions and interests.

These areas of interest include: 
 Arts and Communication
 Global Studies
 Health & Social Sciences
 STEM – Science, Technology, Engineering & Math
Within each area, students select a Program of Study to deepen and focus learning in specific paths.

Athletics
Chanhassen's athletic teams competed in the Lake Conference of the Minnesota State High School League for their first year as a school. They joined the Missota Conference in 2010–2011. As of the 2020-2021 school year, Chanhassen High School competes in the Metro West Conference. Chanhassen were co-conference champions for football in the conference's inaugural year.

In the spring of 2015 the Chanhassen Baseball Team finished the season with a 26-4 record and the Class 3AAA MSHSL State Championship.

Music

Chanhassen has three concert bands including Concert Band, Varsity Band, and Symphonic Winds. Chanhassen has a string orchestra directed by Kate Kowalkowski. Chanhassen has a marching band that has participated in the Chanhassen Homecoming Parade and Steamboat Days Parade in Carver, Minnesota annually since the establishment of the school. Along with that, Chanhassen has three jazz bands and a pit orchestra. Paul Swanson is the director of these ensembles and has led the school to receive many awards. This is in part because of his strong artistic vision from his Ph.D. in symphonic conducting from the Juilliard School of Music. In February 2016, Chanhassen's top jazz band, Jazz 1, also known as the Monday Night Big Band, performed at the prestigious Minnesota Music Educators Association Mid-Winter clinic. Later in April 2016, the band received a Superior rating and the "Best in Site" award at the Region 2AA Jazz Contest.

Along with multiple bands, Chanhassen High School also has a choral department of over 260 student and 8 choirs. These choirs include Concert Choir, Bel Canto, Vivace, the 9th Grade Women's Chorale, Men's Choral, Chamber Singers, and Vox. It also has one choir, "Men Who Sing", known for their non-traditional performances.

Alternative Learning Program 
Chanhassen High School used to house Chaska High School's Alternative Learning Program (ALP). This program has since been moved to the school district's headquarters. The ALP is designed to help students who are in need of a different learning environment find success. Students enrolled in the ALP benefit from smaller classes and additional support structures so that guided learning is more available to each individual.

Security 
In 2013 the Eastern Carver County school district passed a referendum that put 1.8 million dollars towards renovating entryways for security, adding security cameras, creating key-less entries for employees, and installing electronic visitor systems in all District 112 schools.

Notable alumni
Frank Ragnow, NFL player for the Detroit Lions

References

External links

Public high schools in Minnesota
Chanhassen, Minnesota
Schools in Carver County, Minnesota
Educational institutions established in 2009
2009 establishments in Minnesota